Igor is a 2008 computer-animated horror comedy film directed by Tony Leondis from a screenplay by Chris McKenna. Igor, developed and produced by Max Howard with the California-based Exodus Film Group, was the first feature-length animated film to be financed with private equity. The animation was completed at France's Sparx Animation Studios and a facility in Vietnam. It was distributed in North America by MGM Distribution Co. and internationally by The Weinstein Company. It is MGM's first fully computer-animated film as well as the studio's first fully animated film in twelve years following 1996's All Dogs Go to Heaven 2.

Igor features the voices of John Cusack, Steve Buscemi, Sean Hayes, Jay Leno, Eddie Izzard, Jennifer Coolidge, Arsenio Hall, John Cleese, Molly Shannon, and Christian Slater. Conceived by McKenna as a twisting of evil scientist film tropes, Igor features Cusack as the titular Igor, who lives in the kingdom of Malaria where others of his kind serve as assistants to evil scientists. In trying to achieve his dream to become an evil scientist, Igor accidentally creates a sweet female monster named Eva.

Igor's first teaser trailer premiered at the 2008 New York Comic-Con before being released online on May 7, 2008. Promoted with a video game, toys, books, comic books, and fast-food tie-ins, Igor premiered at the Grauman's Chinese Theatre on September 13, 2008, before starting its American nationwide theatrical run five days later. The film received mixed reviews from film critics and grossed $30.7 million worldwide on a $25 million budget. Igor garnered a cult following and received an Annie Award nomination for Valérie Hadida's character design.

Plot 
The Kingdom of Malaria was once a peaceful land of farmers until its environment was devastated by a mysterious storm that never ended and killed all of its plantations, thus driving its inhabitants into poverty. In response to this calamity, Malaria's ruler King Malbert initiates a plan to save the country by having the kingdom's best and most wicked scientists create various doomsday devices and blackmail the rest of the world into paying them by threatening to unleash these devices upon the world. As a result, Malaria becomes a dark country where evil reigns supreme. There is also an annual Evil Science Fair that takes place in an arena known as the Kiliseum, where the inventions fight one another while being broadcast to the rest of the planet. Also, while evil scientists are treated as celebrities, citizens with hunchbacks are treated as second-class, usually referred to by the derogatory name "Igor", and are often employed as lowly minions for these scientists.

One Igor, however, is a talented inventor and smarter than most of Malaria's scientists who aspires to be an evil scientist himself. Among his inventions are his friends Scamper, a re-animated, immortal and suicidal rabbit, and Brain, an unintelligent robot with a human brain transplanted into a life support jar. Unfortunately, he must keep his talent a secret out of fear of being sent to the "Igor Recycling Plant", especially from his master, the incompetent Dr. Glockenstein. Meanwhile, another evil scientist named Dr. Schadenfreude becomes immensely popular due to winning several Evil Science Fairs in a row. In truth, he always steals the prize-winner from another scientist before the fair with help of his shape-shifting girlfriend, Jaclyn, and desires to overthrow King Malbert and rule Malaria as its new king.

One day, Glockenstein is visited by his "girlfriend" Heidi (who is actually Jaclyn in disguise attempting to steal his plans), giving Igor aspirations of romance. After throwing out Heidi, Glockenstein ignores Igor's concerns of using better parts for his latest invention, which is a rocket ship that malfunctions and explodes, taking Glockenstein with it. At this same moment, King Malbert arrives to see Glockenstein and demand that he builds an invention that could defeat Schadenfreude, who Malbert fears will replace him as king due to his popularity. Unable to tell the truth of Glockenstein's death and seizing the opportunity, Igor boldly claims that Glockenstein is creating life, which greatly pleases Malbert, who proclaims that such an invention would make its creator the greatest evil scientist of all time. After the king leaves, Igor reveals to Scamper and Brain his project to create a huge and monstrous being from human remains.

With Brain and Scamper's help, he assembles the giant, and adds an "evil bone" that will make it pure evil. It first seems his experiment failed but seconds later, the monster reveals to have come alive and later escapes. They later find the giantess in an orphanage playing with blind orphans. At the same time, Schadenfreude sneaks into Glickenstein's castle to steal his invention, but he not only discovers that Glickenstein is dead, but his Igor had created a living monster, which he believes will be his key to taking the throne.

Igor manages to lead the giant back to the castle with flowers that she likes. There, he discovers that the evil bone he gave her was not activated, making the monster sweet, friendly and gentle despite being hideous. Igor attempts to activate the evil bone by commanding the monster to kill a fly, but she instead catches it and sets it outside. Igor tries to convince the monster that she is evil but fails as the gentle giantess misinterpreted it as "Eva", thinking that's the name he gave her. Igor later attempts to brainwash Eva into becoming evil by bringing her to a brainwashing salon. Brain also decides to get his brain cleaned and to watch TV but breaks the remote to his TV, so he takes the remote from Eva's room and, in an attempt to change the channel, inadvertently changes the monster's TV channel from a horror movie marathon to a talk show whose topic of the day is the history of acting. She ends up watching the talk show for several hours and upon leaving the salon, she can speak proper English and aspires to be an actress.

Igor then reluctantly takes his creation back to the castle in their car, bemoaning his failures. On the way back to the castle, Schadenfreude chases after Igor in an attempt to steal Eva by using a shrink ray, only to fail and end up shrinking himself. Igor and his friends nearly go over a cliff, but Eva saves them all, showing her appreciation of all life. Brain then brags on about how he changed the channel for Eva's TV, thus admitting that he made her what she is. Upon learning this, Igor attempts to kill Brain with an axe in anger for ruining his monster. When Eva questions this, Scamper sarcastically tells her they're practicing for a play and the monster believes that they're performers. Igor then gets the idea to exhibit Eva at the science fair while lying to her that the fair is an "Annie" audition with a few differences. While helping Eva with the “play”, Igor slowly starts to fall for her, who tries to convince him that its always better to be good than evil, no matter how much more successful evil is.

Dr. Schadenfreude takes Igor to his home revealing he knows about Glickenstein's death and Eva, so he offers a compromise, if Igor gives him Eva to overthrow King Malbert he will make Igor Malaria's number one scientist, but Igor refuses forcing Schadenfreude to refute to blackmail. Igor narrowly escapes but is too late to stop Schadenfreude from exposing Igor to the King who sends him to the "Igor Recycling Plant". Schadenfreude tricks Eva into coming with him by having Jaclyn (again disguised as Heidi) pretend to kiss Igor.

At the fair, Schadenfreude manipulates Eva into striking him, activating her evil bone and turning her into a mindless killing machine. He unleashes the monster on the Science Fair where she destroys all the Evil Inventions whilst singing a rendition of "Tomorrow". Brain and Scamper help Igor escape from the plant and learn that Malbert had deliberately killed Malaria's crops with a weather ray that created the storm clouds so he could implement his "Evil Inventions" plan, thereby keeping himself in power. Rushing into the arena, Igor tries to reason with the enraged Eva while Brain and Scamper power down the weather ray. Eva roars furiously at Igor until the sunlight begins to shine once again on Malaria, which permanently deactivates her evil bone and returns her to her sweet and gentle self.

Igor exposes Malbert's lies to the public, telling them they do not need to be evil. The crowd boos at Malbert for his treachery before the damaged weather ray falls and crushes him to death. Dr. Schadenfreude attempts to take power, but Eva humiliates him. Malaria returns to its sunny peaceful ways with the monarchy dissolved and replaced with a republic with Igor as the president. Schadenfreude is reduced to a pickle salesman and Jaclyn, who's revealed to be a female Igor, loses her shapeshifting ability and becomes a pretzel saleswoman (while starting a relationship with Schadenfreude's Igor) while the annual science fair becomes an annual musical theatre showcase. Igor reveals his plan to build a dog to Eva, with her remarking that they'll just adopt if it doesn't work out. Igor and Eva live happily together as Malaria becomes a better place.

Voice cast 
 John Cusack as Igor, a short hunchback who aspires to be an evil scientist.
 Molly Shannon as Eva, the hideous, yet sweet monster Igor makes using human remains, that aspires to be an actress. She is mostly based on Frankenstein's Monster
 Steve Buscemi as Scamper, an immortal, sarcastic, deadly bunny with suicidal tendencies. 
 Sean Hayes as Brain, an unintelligent sentient robot with a human brain inside a jar. Scamper teases Brain by calling him "Brian", because he misspelled his jar. Eva later gives him a new sticker, with the word "Brain" spelled right.
 Eddie Izzard as Dr. Fredrick Schadenfreude, a fraudulent, flamboyant rival scientist that takes credit for other evil scientists' inventions in hopes of becoming king of Malaria.
 Jennifer Coolidge as Jaclyn/Heidi, Dr. Schadenfreude's shapeshifting girlfriend who helps him steal other scientists' inventions by wooing other scientists with her shapeshifting. It is latter revealed her true form is a female Igor.
 Jay Leno as King Malbert, the tyrannical ruler of Malaria who turned their main export from crops to mad science after the storm cloud came, which later is revealed he created.
 Arsenio Hall as Carl Cristall, an invisible talk show host that wears anything but pants.
 Christian Slater as Dr. Schadenfreude's Igor.
 John Cleese as Dr. Glickenstein, a tedious-minded and incompetent mad scientist with a prosthetic arm and Igor's master.
 Paul Vogt as Buzz Offmann.
 James Lipton as himself.
 Jess Harnell as Announcer, Royal Guard #2.

Production

Development 

While attending the 1998 Cannes Film Festival, Chris McKenna's interest in Transylvania-inspired settings caused him to conceive an evil scientist film like Frankenstein (1931) that has all of its common tropes twisted; the hunchback is smart instead of dumb, the scientist's creation is friendly instead of monstrous, the evil scientist isn't intelligent, and the jar brain is stupid. In the 2000s, the increasing amount of cheap technology led smaller, independent companies to produce films in the animation industry; one of them was Exodus, where its film Igor was the first feature-length animation to be budgeted entirely with private equity. McKenna pitched his idea to the California-based Exodus Film Group as a three-paper treatment, instead of as a presentation of drawings and concept art usual for pitching animated features; the company accepted and instructed investors worldwide to finance the film. According to Exodus president John D. Eraklis, "We chose it because it was the most original concept that we had come across in years and Chris McKenna is a brilliant writer."

The Exodus project was first announced on September 7, 2004, with the involvements of McKenna, executive producer Max Howard, and 50 to 75 animators from the studio ElectroAge revealed. Exodus was developing the film as part of a $50 million fund that also included The Hero of Color City and Amarillo Armadillo; Igor made up a chunk of the fund, being budgeted at $30 million. The original plan was to produce a short film, titled Igor: Unholy Frijoles, that would get the producers comfortable with making a feature-length film and serve as a launch for a longer version of Igor to be released in 2007. The seven-minute short was also going to premiere in festivals before being distributed.

In a November 2005 interview, Howard announced that the rigging and voice recording for the short was completed and that storyboards were nearly finished for the animation to start soon; he also shared about the film's content, "This is a slightly edgier picture we're dealing with. We're taking a tongue-in-cheek look at the horror genre, in particular, Frankenstein stories but taken from Igor's point of view. There's sort of an underclass were you're born an Igor and you can only aspire to be an Igor, but, of course, he has greater aspirations than that. It's not supposed to be scary, but there's a gross-out value, which we hope kids will really enjoy. We're not making a soft, preschool property either." In early 2006, in addition to making ways into festivals, DVDs of Igor: Unholy Frijoles were being sold by Exodus to those who invested a minimum of $30,000 in the feature film's budget; in documents, Exodus enticed investors by citing a 2004 Dove Foundation study regarding the superior amount of profitability of G-rated films over R-rated motion pictures.

On September 22, 2006, it was revealed Tony Leondis would direct the feature. He got onboard due to sharing McKenna's interest in horror films and sardonic sense of humor, in addition to being into film noir and German Expressionism works; Leondis helped the writer in developing the setting's backstory, a more complicated process than McKenna predicted that required collaboration from not just the director but also the actors and producers. Something familiar enough to connect to, but at the same time fresh and unexpected so that it became a fun ride – and maybe makes them think a little along the way."

Casting 
As Howard described casting A-list actors for the film, "We sent them the script. Steve Buscemi signed on very early, and he's an 'actor's actor.' Then others signed on... it just took off that way." On March 4, 2005, Slater joined the cast to play the title character in the short film, and Fil Barlow to direct. On July 19, 2005, Buscemi, Cleese, and Leno entered the cast as the characters Scamper, Dr. Glickenstein, and Brian the Brain. Jeremy Piven and Molly Shannon, Leondis' first decision for Eva, were cast for the roles of Dr. Schadenfreude and Eva respectively on October 19, 2006. On January 10, 2007 Jennifer Coolidge joined the cast to play Jaclyn and Heidi, and Leno switched from voicing Brain to King Malbert. On March 28, 2007, John Cusack replaced Slater in the role of Igor, and Hayes joined to voice Brain; the release date was also set for October 24, 2008. Leondis thought Cusack had a "world-weary, but hopeful" tone to his voice perfect for Igor's character arc. On May 11, 2007, Arsenio Hall was revealed to be in the cast. On July 26, 2007, Eddie Izzard replaced Piven for the role of Dr. Schadenfreude. Izzard came up with his own accent for Schadenfreude.

Visuals 
Igor was produced over the course of two years beginning in November 2006. Due to Igor's inspiration originating from a European nation and being most famous in the continent of Europe, Howard wanted to have a European studio responsible for the animation's aesthetic. He chose Sparx Animation Studios, where its French office did the designs and used $4 million worth of tech for making the film. It was Sparx's first theatrical film, as their previous work were direct-to-video products and television productions such as Rolie Polie Olie (1998–2004) and Mickey's Twice Upon a Christmas (2004). A chunk of the 65 Sparx artists and Leondis previously worked at Walt Disney Animation France, and appreciated the amount of freedom they had when working on Igor. Leondis explained, "At Disney everything had to be done in the house style, but here they really wanted to push boundaries. I came in and said, 'We're going to do something sumptuous, something sophisticated, something crazy. We're going to mix freaks, skulls and the generally creepy with the architecture of the Liberace museum.'" Igor was the last production of Sparx before it shut down its French offices a few months after the film's release.

Design and art style 
Igor's first six months with Sparx involved the French facility conceiving the visual style. For the film's 120 characters, 65 locations, and 250 props, Leondis wanted them to be asymmetrical, a decision coming from the film's backstory about a farm land taken over by castles with technology: "I wanted the in-organic shapes to not exactly fit, to be thrust upon our peaceful organic world."

In order to achieve both a film noir and an accessible-while-creepy aesthetic, Leondis and the art director he worked with, Olivier Besson, incorporated a fair amount of mist and smoke. Leondis also went for an art style inspired by the fashion works of Vivienne Westwood, where it takes elements from a variety of time periods; he summarized the setting's look as a mixture of the middle ages, the industrial revolution, and "Pop sixties." The visual's lighting and shading took cues from the works of Rembrandt. Other influences Leondis used on the look included Brassaï's use of black-and-white and Mary Blair's color style. Leondis stated regarding the coloring, "Olivier [Besson] would  use  an  unrealistic  color  like  pink  for  the  sky  if  the  emotional  moment called for it — and somehow still made it feel like our world."

In Howard's words, the animators went for a "puppet sensibility" in the characters' movements and designs, a decision inspired by the 1967 stop motion film Mad Monster Party? (1967). McKenna explained, "the most difficult challenge with Igor was going to be portraying him as a hunchback without making him freakish." The titular protagonist of Igor wasn't a prisoner per se, but character designer Valérie Hadida nonetheless gave his attire prison sensibilities to symbolize him being jailed in the land he lives in; the back of his "straitjacket" has a prison uniform pattern, and the cuffs on his hands indicate handcuffs. Hadida was later nominated for an Annie Award for Character Design in an Animated Feature Production for her work on Igor. Two patches of orange are also on Igor's back to suggest hope before Eva enters the world, who is colored a warm yellow to symbolize her adding "hope and light" to the land.

Animation 
The animation of Sparx's designs were outsourced to a facility in Ho Chi Minh City that consisted of 150 animators and only worked in television advertisements. Since none of the Vietnamese animators could speak English, Leondis recorded videotapes of himself doing character movements and the voice actors doing their lines; and the Vietnamese workers would animate the characters with the tapes as references. According to Howard, "It was a real buzz to go out there and see our artwork come to life on their monitors. It's a subtle film, but they got it." Igor was computer-animated with Autodesk Maya in less than 18 months.

The set up of the tools and workflow for animating the film went on the same six months the designs were being conceived; the Paris office modelled and rigged the characters, and the Vietnamese space modelled the props and sets. A 3D animatic was done in the next four months by six animators and two camera people, with two-and-a-half of those months involving revisions of the animatic. The following six months, 50 of the Vietnamese workers animated the film before it was taken to the Paris office for the lighting and final compositing to be done with Digital Fusion. According to Sparx manager Jean-Philippe Again, each animator completed an average of 0.6 seconds of animation. Rending was done with another Autodesk program, Mental Ray; and the company actually trained Sparx in rendering more efficiently for the first half of production . Since Sparx was in a partnership with HP Inc., hardware by the technology company was used for Igor.

Music 

Leondis first met Patrick Doyle, one of his favorite film composers, about Igor in October 2007; Leondis showed Doyle the film without music as well as concept drawings, which got the composer "immediately excited." Due to having themes for different types of characters, Igor's score incorporates multiple styles, such as piano concerto for Eva's theme and a tango tinge for Dr. Schadenfreude's dance-y side. Leondis instructed Doyle to give the score a "slightly eastern feel," offering him the works of composers such as Bela Bartok to reference from. The score's Gothic elements were executed through a set of Choir samples. The soundtrack also includes five Louis Prima songs. The soundtrack was released on September 30, 2008, by Varèse Sarabande. "Pocketful of Sunshine" by Natasha Bedingfield was featured in the film's end credits, but not included on the soundtrack.

Release

Pre-release 
The Weinstein Company bought the North American rights to Igor on February 1, 2006. However, differences towards the artistic vision and release idea of the film between Weinstein and Exodus led Weinstein to sell the North American rights back to Exodus. However, Weinstein was involved in international distribution, and when selling Igor at the 2006 Marché du Film before production started, companies from almost every territory bought it; according to Howard, "We pre-sold [the film] to all the former east bloc countries pretty much on the name alone."

As of January 13, 2008, the release date was set at October 17, 2008. The Weinstein Company ran an Igor panel at the 2008 New York Comic-Con, where, in addition to being an exclusive premiere of the first trailer, McKenna and Leondis presented details about the film. At the panel, Leondis also announced the contest Be an Igor, where voice actors contributed video recordings of themselves acting like an Igor for their voices to be used for extras; the top-five results were included as extras for the film's DVD.

Igor's first poster, made entirely by Leondis, was released by Weinstein on April 23, 2008; and the first trailer premiered online via AniMagTV with a high definition video released on Yahoo! on May 8, 2008. A presentation for Igor took place at the 2008 Cannes Film Festival, where Harvey Weinstein, McKenna, and Slater attended. On August 28, 2008, Exodus partnered with Malaria.com and the Against Malaria Foundation for Igor to be a spokesperson for donating to end the Malaria crisis.

On September 15, 2008, Collider revealed another trailer and seven clips of Igor.

Merchandise 
Exodus planned Igor to be a franchise since its inception and made several Igor merchandise deals with other companies while the film was in production. On May 11, 2007, Exodus signed a deal with Simon & Schuster to publish seven children's books based on Igor. Exodus signed another merchandise deal on June 11 with Corgi International, where they would release various products, such as figures, play sets, electronic role-play games, pocket money toys, plush toys, in September 2008. On July 26, Exodus inked a deal with IDW Publishing to produce a set of comic books, a prequel series to Simon & Schuster's Igor books. On November 16, 2007, Exodus penned a deal with CKE Restaurants Inc. to have more than 3,000 Carl's Jr. and Hardee's restaurants sell Igor toy in Cool Kids Combos. On December 7, 2007, Exodus signed with Interactive Game Group and Legacy Games to develop and publish Igor video game adaptations for the Nintendo DS, Wii, personal computer, and wireless.

Release 

Igor had its worldwide premiere on September 13, 2008, at the Grauman's Chinese Theatre, where the "red carpet" was purple instead of its usual color. Howard recalled that "almost everyone turned out for the premiere."
Worldwide, Igor was released in Taiwan on October 3, 2008; the Philippines on October 8, 2008; Israel and the United Kingdom on October 10, 2008; Greece on October 23, 2008; Malaysia, Qatar, and the United Arab Emirates on November 20, 2008; Iceland on November 21, 2008; Singapore on December 11, 2008; France on December 17, 2008; Kuwait and Lebanon on January 1, 2009; Australia on January 3, 2009; Oman on January 8, 2009; Bahrain on January 22, 2009; South Africa on January 23, 2009; Russia on February 19, 2009; Belgium and Egypt on April 1, 2009; the Netherlands on April 23, 2009; Mexico on April 24, 2009; Turkey on May 8, 2009; Spain on June 5, 2009; Portugal on July 23, 2009; Peru on August 13, 2009; Brazil on October 9, 2009; Argentina on December 3, 2009; Japan on January 2, 2010; Chile on February 11, 2010; Uruguay on March 26, 2010; Bolivia on September 9, 2010; South Korea on March 10, 2011; Germany on July 10, 2011; and Venezuela on September 9, 2011.

Reception

Box office 
Metro-Goldwyn-Mayer released Igor theatrically in the United States on September 19, 2008, to 2,300 theaters, more than "1,200 to 1,500 screens" the producers predicted.

According to Gitesh Pandya, "pre-release expectations were low since it is not based on any popular brand name property." However, he projected an opening weekend gross of $8 million due to no competition with other family films and "a marketing push highlighting how Halloween comes early this year thanks to this monster mash." He also suggested the film would drop only modestly in later weeks.

In its opening weekend the film grossed $7,803,347, ranking #4 at the box office alongside Lakeview Terrace, Burn After Reading and My Best Friend's Girl. As of December 2019, Igor has the 184th biggest opening weekend in a September month. The film then grossed $19,528,602 domestically and $11,218,902 overseas for a worldwide total of $30,747,504. In the UK, the film opened on 32 screens with a gross of £56,177 for a screen average of £1,756 and placing it at No. 20 in the box office chart. The mainstream release opened on October 17 at 418 screens and made £981,750 with a screen average of £2,348. This placed it at No. 3 for that weekend. The UK total gross is £1,110,859.

Noel Murray opined that Igor had a difficult time selling tickets due to being "too macabre for young children and too cutesy for hip adult moviegoers," and Adam Quigley reported it was "instantly forgotten following its release."

Critical predictions 
Alex Billington, also covering the trailer, predicted Igor might be good thanks to its cast, but may do mediocrely at the box office, citing the performance of Arthur and the Invisibles, a previous English-language animated film released in 2006 and made in France. I Watch Stuff was turned off by the "archetypical Disney-esque jokes and characters" presented in the trailer, also mocking Igor's design as "a hunchbacked David Gest." Peter Sciretta also had little faith in the film's quality due to Weinstein's poor reputation with animated films, but Kryten Syxx wrote that "there's enough [in the trailer] to please horror fans" as well as children, Ryan Parsons suggested that Igor "looks charming enough" to compete with bigger productions from Pixar and DreamWorks, and Cartoon Brew thought it looked "intriguing" judging by the trailer.

Contemporaneous reviews 
According to Rotten Tomatoes, "critics say the film is something of a Frankenstein's monster, stitching together recycled parts from Shrek and The Nightmare Before Christmas. [...] While the pundits say Igor has moments of Tim Burton-esque visual invention, it's a pretty mediocre affair, filled with shopworn pop-culture references and manic action but few laughs; plus, it's probably a bit too dark for the wee ones." It holds an approval rating of 39% based on 93 reviews; while the film holds a "mixed or average" aggregate score of 40/100 on Metacritic based on 19 reviews as of the same time. While The Age called Igor "a fun time-killer for kids aged tween and up;"  The Austin Chronicle panned it for being uninspired in all aspects, such as animation, story, and voice acting; and The New York Post labeled it as "an excuse for a wearying parade of pop-culture references and voice cameos by celebrities," also calling its influences used more for "desperation than inspiration."

Many criticisms were pointed towards the story, mainly that it was very unclear in messages, form, and age appeal. According to The New York Times, "Kiddies [...] will be undiverted by the humdrum animation and a palette that mirrors the film's moral and meteorological gloom. Neither will they respond to a script (by Chris McKenna) that seems more focused on tickling movie-savvy adults [...] 'Igor' leaves us unmoved by its vertically challenged hero." Exclaim! summarized, " the journey is sloppy and uneven, with technical fouls aplenty. [...] It is difficult to determine what audience might have an appreciation for this, as the material will prove too dark for many youngsters and too insipid for elders." Slant Magazine writer Nick Schager concluded that it "feels chintzy and imitative, with kids unlikely to be seriously captivated by its bland hero and viewers over the age of five ultimately apt to relate only to Scamper (Steve Buscemi), an immortal rabbit desperate to commit suicide." Dark Horizons writer Garth Franklin wrote that its content was too little in amount for a full-length film. Some reviewers were turned off by its pacing; Franklin noted that its "characters run around in a manic rush and yet there's little 'action' to speak of," while Robert Abele of Los Angeles Times wrote the pacing issues came in its editing, camera movements, and line deliveries.

Michael Phillips called Igor unfunny, "uneven and overstuffed," although highlight the presence of Scamper. The San Francisco Chronicle writer Peter Hartlaub opined "the filmmakers waste some clever and subversive writing by cramming everything into a Disneyfied plot filled with misunderstandings and morality speeches." Similarly, The Globe and Mail thought its interesting monster movie concept was "thwarted by traditional prejudices." Wrote Kurt Loder, "the picture suffers from a humor deficit. The fact that the jar in which Brain resides is mislabeled "Brian" is not hilarious; nor is a strained butt-scratching gag involving an invisible talk-show host." The story is "innocuous and predictable—a modest do-gooder trying to pretend that its not Cartoonland's most direct attack of the Bush administration," wrote Amy Nicholson. In the opinion of an IGN critic, "Writer Chris McKenna [...] has essentially crafted a tale that robs the genre of all of its hallmarks – real monsters, gore, or even just genuinely scary moments – in lieu of a superficially entertaining tome that either borrows heavily from the above predecessors or doesn't have enough creativity not to steal from their iconic landscapes."

Mark Demetrius of Filmink opined that the film was ruined by cliches, an overwhelming amount of adult jokes, forced humor, and "pathetic" ending. Franklin also panned its "dated" and "forced" pop-culture humor, and Janice Page wrote it "riffs on classic monster-movie cliches mostly by spinning them into newly unfunny cliches." A review from the Toronto Star claimed cliches, "movie quotes and Hollywood parodies dictate the action," also stating the kids wouldn't get the references. Schager explained, "Director Anthony Leondis peppers his tale with a host of leaden cinematic references children will almost surely miss, which is just as well since virtually every film-related gag directed at adults feels like a pitiful attempt at knowing cleverness." According to The Hollywood Reporter, the plot was "undernourished, and the wit erupts only in flashes." The Orlando Sentinel dismissed it as "chatty and dull" and "a bit too reliant on innuendo." As Entertainment Weekly summarized in their review, "the visuals are a kick; the groan-inducing dialogue isn't," and the hero is "charmless." Even a positive TV Guide review thought it didn't work as a children's film due to its adult references and horror film elements.

Pete Hammond of Boxoffice called Igor "first rate" for a low-budget film, while the movie's look was considered by Demetrius to be its best aspect. Some sources thought the film was "all its own" and "fresh" in spite of its influences of Tim Burton films and old-school horror movies, The Orlando Sentinel labeling the animation a "credible" rip-off of The Nightmare Before Christmas (1993). The A.V. Club stated the visuals succeeded in "detail and fluidity" if not for taking "advantage of three-dimensional space." One critic highlighted the film's use of shadow, "not only to strike the pre-requisite mad scientist mood but to enhance the feeling of 3 dimensions. This, coupled with a cinematic eye leaning towards the dramatic, further pulls you into the feature, exposing the creator's love for black and white horror films of years past." The visuals did have its detractors, however. Schager wrote the animation is "at times is vibrant and elaborately eerie, and at others is so stiff, inexpressive and flat." IGN thought the animation looked like "a bargain-basement ripoff of better films." Franklin  called it too "inconsistent," Hartlaub who opined "the character design leans more toward disturbing than cute," and Total Film who was turned off by the "shoddiness" of the art style. The voice cast was heavily praised, being called "stellar," "top-notch," and a "quirky highlight" in reviews. According to one journalist, "this is one cast that consistently had me laughing across the board."

Some reviewers found the underlying concepts to be clever, such as a Wired review that opined the film had a "clever premise," "outrageous characters, some artsy scenery, and some cool laboratories. The Sydney Morning Herald praised it for being unique from most family films due to its cast of improv actors and impertinent horror concept: "Igor celebrates a defiantly adolescent and suitably caricatured vision of mortality with the potential to have adults and special young malcontents in stitches." A Total Film reviewer called it "a compellingly oddball tale that should eventually find its niche as a minor late-night cult classic for Nightmare Before Christmas fans," although called its themes of "suicide and spousal abuse" odd for a family film. Some critics called it one of the rare family flicks to appeal to adults as well as kids. In the words of a Newsday character, "the overall tenor of "Igor" is goofily funny — probably a bit sophisticated for kids but certainly good-natured," and "the animated characters possess an unusual depth of emotion." The A.V. Club labeled it an "appealing mix of macabre, reference-heavy horror-movie trappings and good-natured positivism," favorably comparing it to Burton's works for being "appealingly manic and cute as well as sick." A five-out-of-five review from Dread Central claimed, "The comedic timing is top notch with humor that is 95% mean spirited, often remarkably dark and at times even a little gory." Even a reviewer who found the film's concept conformist, Peter Bradshaw, wrote that it was made up for by its dark tone.

The inclusion of Louis Prima songs also garnered divided reactions; while appreciated by some reviewers to the point where one called it "the film's best decision," others found it unfitting with Doyle's score. The soundtrack was ecstatically received by Hartlaub for its mixture of song styles.

Home media 
Igor was released to DVD, Blu-ray, and Amazon Prime in the United States and Canada on January 20, 2009, by 20th Century Fox Home Entertainment; Wal-mart exclusively sold DVDs with memorabilia, toys, and a book of the film, and Best Buy sold them five-dollars off. The DVD includes deleted scenes, bloopers, and a featurette named Be An Igor; and Blu-ray includes those plus an alternate opening and commentary by Leondis, McKenna and Howard. The film ranked fourth in its opening weekend at the DVD sales chart, making $3,509,704 off 175,000 DVD units. As per the latest figures, 596,146 DVD units have been sold, translating to $11,739,919 in revenue. Internationally, the film was issued on Blu-ray in Germany on December 3, 2009 and Mexico in 2014. MGM later included Igor in two of its collections: a Blu-ray Best of Family collection released on February 4, 2014, and an MGM 90th Anniversary DVD set distributed on June 3, 2014.

References

Citations

Bibliography

External links

 
 
 
 
 
 
 

2008 films
2008 comedy films
2008 fantasy films
2008 science fiction films
2008 computer-animated films
2000s American animated films
2000s French animated films
2000s children's comedy films
2000s children's fantasy films
2000s children's animated films
2000s monster movies
2000s English-language films
American computer-animated films
American children's animated comic science fiction films
American children's animated science fantasy films
American science fiction comedy films
American fantasy comedy films
American monster movies
American robot films
French computer-animated films
French children's comedy films
French children's fantasy films
French animated science fiction films
French science fiction comedy films
French fantasy comedy films
English-language French films
Mad scientist films
Animated films about rabbits and hares
Animated films about robots
Films set in Europe
Films set in a fictional country
Films set in the 20th century
Films directed by Tony Leondis
Films with screenplays by Chris McKenna
Films scored by Patrick Doyle
Metro-Goldwyn-Mayer films
Metro-Goldwyn-Mayer animated films
The Weinstein Company films
The Weinstein Company animated films
Gothic fiction
Works based on Frankenstein